In eight-dimensional geometry, a pentellated 8-simplex is a convex uniform 8-polytope with 5th order truncations of the regular 8-simplex.

There are two unique pentellations of the 8-simplex. Including truncations, cantellations, runcinations, and sterications, there are 32 more pentellations. These polytopes are a part of a family 135 uniform 8-polytopes with A8 symmetry. A8, [37] has order 9 factorial symmetry, or 362880. The bipentalled form is symmetrically ringed, doubling the symmetry order to 725760, and is represented the double-bracketed group [[37]]. The A8 Coxeter plane projection shows order [9] symmetry for the pentellated 8-simplex, while the bipentellated 8-simple is doubled to [18] symmetry.

Pentellated 8-simplex

Coordinates 

The Cartesian coordinates of the vertices of the pentellated 8-simplex can be most simply positioned in 9-space as permutations of (0,0,0,0,1,1,1,1,2). This construction is based on facets of the pentellated 9-orthoplex.

Images

Bipentellated 8-simplex

Coordinates 
The Cartesian coordinates of the vertices of the bipentellated 8-simplex can be most simply positioned in 9-space as permutations of (0,0,1,1,1,1,1,2,2). This construction is based on facets of the bipentellated 9-orthoplex.

Images

Related polytopes 

This polytope is one of 135 uniform 8-polytopes with A8 symmetry.

Notes

References 
 H.S.M. Coxeter: 
 H.S.M. Coxeter, Regular Polytopes, 3rd Edition, Dover New York, 1973 
 Kaleidoscopes: Selected Writings of H.S.M. Coxeter, edited by F. Arthur Sherk, Peter McMullen, Anthony C. Thompson, Asia Ivic Weiss, Wiley-Interscience Publication, 1995,  
 (Paper 22) H.S.M. Coxeter, Regular and Semi Regular Polytopes I, [Math. Zeit. 46 (1940) 380-407, MR 2,10]
 (Paper 23) H.S.M. Coxeter, Regular and Semi-Regular Polytopes II, [Math. Zeit. 188 (1985) 559-591]
 (Paper 24) H.S.M. Coxeter, Regular and Semi-Regular Polytopes III, [Math. Zeit. 200 (1988) 3-45]
 Norman Johnson Uniform Polytopes, Manuscript (1991)
 N.W. Johnson: The Theory of Uniform Polytopes and Honeycombs, Ph.D. 
  x3o3o3o3o3x3o3o, o3x3o3o3o3o3x3o

External links 
 Polytopes of Various Dimensions
 Multi-dimensional Glossary

8-polytopes